In 1962, the Edward Lewis Wallant Award was established at the University of Hartford, in Connecticut, USA by Fran and Irving Waltman. It is presented annually to a writer whose fiction is considered to have significance for American Jews. The award is named for Jewish American writer Edward Lewis Wallant.

Awards
1963 - Norman Fruchter, Coat Upon a Stick
1964 - Seymour Epstein, Leah
1965 - Hugh Nissenson, A Pile of Stones
1966 - Gene Hurwitz, Home Is Where You Start From
1967 - Chaim Potok, The Chosen
1968 - no award
1969 - Leo Litwak, Waiting for the News
1970 - no award
1971 - Cynthia Ozick, The Pagan Rabbi
1972 - Robert Kotlowitz,  Somewhere Else
1973 - Arthur A. Cohen, In the Days of Simon Stern 
1974 - Susan Fromberg Schaeffer, Anya
1975 - Anne Bernays, Growing Up Rich
1976 - no award
1977 - Curt Leviant, The Yemenite Girl
1978 - no award
1979 - no award
1980 - Johanna Kaplan, O My America!
1981 - Allen Hoffman, Kagan's Superfecta
1982 - no award
1983 - Francine Prose, Hungry Hearts
1984 - no award
1985 - Jay Neugeboren, Before My Life Began
1986 - Daphne Merkin, Enchantment
1987 - Steve Stern, Lazar Malkin Enters Heaven
1988 - Tova Reich, Master of the Return
1989 - Jerome Badanes, The Final Opus of Leon Solomon
1990 - no award
1991 - no award
1992 - Melvin Jules Bukiet, Stories of an Imaginary Childhood
1993 - Gerald Shapiro, From Hunger
1994 - no award
1995 - Rebecca Goldstein, Mazel
1996 - Thane Rosenbaum, Elijah Visible
1997 - Harvey Grossinger, The Quarry
1998 - no award
1999 - Allegra Goodman, Kaaterskill Falls
2000 - Judy Budnitz, If I Told You Once
2001 - Myla Goldberg, Bee Season
2002 - Dara Horn, In the Image
2003 - Joan Leegant, An Hour in Paradise
2004 - Jonathan Rosen, Joy Comes in the Morning
2005 - Nicole Krauss, The History of Love
2006 - no award
2007 - Ehud Havazelet, Bearing the Body
2008 - Eileen Pollack, In the Mouth
2009 - Sara Houghteling, Pictures at an Exhibition
2010 - Julie Orringer, The Invisible Bridge
2011 - Edith Pearlman, Binocular Vision
2012 - Joshua Henkin, The World Without You
2013 - Kenneth Bonert, The Lion Seeker
2014 - David Bezmozgis, The Betrayers
2015 - Rebecca Dinerstein,	"The Sunlit Night"
2016 - Ayelet Tsabari,	"The Best Place on Earth"
2017 - Margot Singer, "Underground Fugue"
2018 - Eduardo Halfon, "Mourning"
2019 - Peter Orner, "Maggie Brown & Others"
2020 - Lee Conell, "The Party Upstairs"

References
The Edward Lewis Wallant Award, The University of Hartford

American fiction awards
Jewish literary awards
Jews and Judaism in the United States
Awards established in 1962
University of Hartford
Literary awards honoring minority groups
1962 establishments in Connecticut